Bob Robson (June 11, 1957 – April 28, 1988) was an American soccer goalkeeper who played professionally in the North American Soccer League and Major Indoor Soccer League.

Robson attended Southern Illinois University Edwardsville where he played on the men's soccer team from 1975 to 1978.  In 1979, he turned professional with the Atlanta Chiefs of the North American Soccer League.  On November 20, 1979, the St. Louis Steamers of the Major Indoor Soccer League signed Robson.

On April 28, 1988, Robson was shot and killed by police officers. He had shot and wounded his brother-in-law with a shotgun shortly before.

References

External links
 NASL/MISL stats

1957 births
1988 deaths
Soccer players from St. Louis
American soccer players
Atlanta Chiefs players
Major Indoor Soccer League (1978–1992) players
North American Soccer League (1968–1984) players
St. Louis Steamers (original MISL) players
SIU Edwardsville Cougars men's soccer players
Association football goalkeepers
People shot dead by law enforcement officers in the United States
Deaths by firearm in Missouri